State Route 19 (SR 19) is a  state highway in the northwestern part of the U.S. state of Alabama. The southern terminus of the route is at its intersection with SR 17 at Detroit in northern Lamar County. The northern terminus of the route is at its intersection with SR 24 at Red Bay in Franklin County near the Mississippi state line.

Major intersections

See also

References

External links

019
Transportation in Lamar County, Alabama
Transportation in Marion County, Alabama
Transportation in Franklin County, Alabama